{{Automatic taxobox
| image = Agrilus anxius 1326203.jpg
| image_caption =  Agrilus anxius
| taxon = Agrilini
| authority = Laporte, 1835
}}Agrilini' is a tribe of metallic wood-boring beetles in the family Buprestidae. There are at least 40 described genera in Agrilini.

Subtribes and Genera
Biolib lists four subtribes:
Agrilina
Auth.: Laporte, 1835
 Agrilochyseus Théry, 1935
 Agrilodia Obenberger, 1923
 Agriloides Kerremans, 1903
 Agrilus Curtis, 1825
 Australodraco Curletti, 2006
 Autarcontes Waterhouse, 1887
 Bellamyus Curletti, 1997
 Callipyndax Waterhouse, 1887
 Dorochoviella Jendek, 2006
 Malawiella Bellamy, 1990
 Maublancia Bellamy, 1998
 Mychommatus Murray, 1868
 Nelsonagrilus Jendek, 2006
 Omochyseus Waterhouse, 1887
 Parakamosia Obenberger, 1924
 Pilotrulleum Bellamy & Westcott, 1995
 Sakalianus Jendek, 2007
 Sarawakita Obenberger, 1924
 Sjoestedtius Théry, 1931

Amorphosternina
Auth.: Cobos, 1974
 Amorphosternoides Cobos, 1974
 Amorphosternus Deyrolle, 1864
 Bergidora Kerremans, 1903
 Diadora Kerremans, 1900
 Diadorina Cobos, 1974
 Helferina Cobos, 1956

Amyiina
Auth.: Holyński, 1993
 Amyia Saunders, 1871
 Euamyia Kerremans, 1903
 Pareumerus Deyrolle, 1864

Rhaeboscelidina
Auth.: Cobos, 1976
 Paragrilus Saunders, 1871
 Rhaeboscelis Chevrolat, 1838
 Velutia Kerremans, 1900

Genera incertae sedis
 Deyrollius Obenberger, 1922
 Eumerophilus Deyrolle, 1864
 Lepismadora Velten in Velten & Bellamy, 1987
 Nickerleola Obenberger, 1923
 Parasambus Descarpentries & Villiers, 1966
 Pseudagrilodes Obenberger, 1921
 Pseudagrilus Laporte, 1835
 Sambus Deyrolle, 1864
 Wendleria Obenberger, 1924

References

 "A catalog and bibliography of the Buprestoidea of America north of Mexico", Nelson et al. 2008. The Coleopterists Society, Special Publication No. 4. 274 pp.
 Bellamy, C. L., and G. H. Nelson / Arnett, Ross H. Jr. et al., eds. (2002). "Family 41. Buprestidae Leach, 1815". American Beetles, vol. 2: Polyphaga: Scarabaeoidea through Curculionoidea, 98-112.
 Bellamy, C.L. (2008-2009). A World Catalogue and Bibliography of the Jewel Beetles (Coleoptera: Buprestoidea), Volumes 1-5. Pensoft Series Faunistica No. 76-80.
 Nelson, Gayle H., George C. Walters Jr., R. Dennis Haines, and Charles L. Bellamy (2008). "A Catalog and Bibliography of the Buprestoidea of America North of Mexico". The Coleopterists' Society, Special Publication, no. 4, iv + 274.

Further reading

 Arnett, R. H. Jr., M. C. Thomas, P. E. Skelley and J. H. Frank. (eds.). (21 June 2002). American Beetles, Volume II: Polyphaga: Scarabaeoidea through Curculionoidea. CRC Press LLC, Boca Raton, Florida .
 
 Richard E. White. (1983). Peterson Field Guides: Beetles''. Houghton Mifflin Company.

Buprestidae